Leopold Loewy (Löwy) Sr. (born 1840) was an Austrian chess player.

He took 7th place, while his son Leopold Löwy Jr. took 9th at Vienna 1904 (Carl Schlechter won).

He and his son elaborated and introduced the Loewy Gambit (1.e4 e5 2.f4 Bc5 3.Nf3 d6 4.b4) in the King's Gambit, Declined, Classical Variation  [C 30].

References

1840 births
Austrian Jews
Austrian chess players
Jewish chess players
Year of death missing